The al-Manar Centre (sometimes referred to as 2 Glynrhondda Street) is a Salafi mosque in the Cathays district of Cardiff, Wales. Founded in 1992, it describes itself as being "one of [the] Ahlus-Sunnah organisations". A widely circulated claim holds that a mosque was registered at this address in 1860, which would make the Al-Manar Centre the oldest mosque in the United Kingdom. This has, however, been shown to result from a transcription error in the Register of Religious Sites, making the Liverpool Muslim Institute, established in 1891, the first.

In 2014, the mosque became the subject of media attention after it emerged that Nasser Muthana and Reyaad Khan, two young men who appeared in a propaganda video for the Islamic State of Iraq and the Levant, and Muthana's brother Aseel, also believed to be fighting in Syria for the same organisation, had worshipped at the mosque. The centre denied that it had played any part in their radicalisation.

See also
Islam in Wales

References

External links
 

Mosques in Wales
1992 establishments in Wales
Cathays
Religious buildings and structures in Cardiff
Charities based in Wales
Sunni Islam in the United Kingdom
Salafi mosques in the United Kingdom